Sale Sharks is a professional rugby union club from Greater Manchester, England. They play in Premiership Rugby, England's top division of rugby.

Originally founded in 1861 as Sale Football Club, now a distinct amateur club, they adopted the nickname Sharks in 1999. Since 2012 they have played their home games at the A.J. Bell Stadium in Barton-upon-Irwell, Salford. Between 1905 and 2003 they played at Heywood Road in Sale, before moving to Edgeley Park in Stockport where they stayed until 2012. Their traditional colours are blue and white.

Sale have won four major trophies. They were Premiership Rugby Champions in 2005–06, won the European Rugby Challenge Cup in 2001–02, 2004–05 and the Premiership Rugby Cup in 2019/20. They also won the RFU Championship in 1994.

In the 2021–22 Premiership Rugby season Sale finished sixth, which entitled them to compete in the 2022–23 European Rugby Champions Cup. The Director of Rugby is Alex Sanderson who was appointed in January 2021 following the departure of Steve Diamond in December 2020.

History

1861–1990s
The club was founded in 1861 and is one of the oldest clubs in English rugby. Throughout their history they have been one of the leading rugby union clubs in the North of England. Sale moved into Heywood Road in 1905 and would remain there until 2003.

Sale were unbeaten in 26 matches, winning 24 and drawing two in 1911.

Although Pat Davies is counted as Sale's first international, having been picked to play for England in 1927, it was G.A.M. Isherwood who was Sale's first representative in an international Test match, when he played in all three tests of the 1910 British tour to South Africa at scrum-half. The club has consistently provided international players and, during the 1930s, had one of its most dominant periods, fielding players of the calibre of Hal Sever (England), Claude Davey and Wilf Wooller (Wales) and Ken Fyfe (Scotland). It came as little surprise when they took out the 1936 Middlesex Sevens.

Sale ruled the roost in county cup rugby for 15 straight seasons as they went unbeaten from 1972 to 1987 in every one of those cup fixtures. During this period, Sale competed for the chance to be English club champions. In their first year, one after the inaugural competition kicked off in 1971, they made the semi-finals only to lose to eventual winners Coventry 35–6.

Professional era
During the nineties, despite thrilling displays under Paul Turner, and his successor John Mitchell, both club and ground struggled to keep a grip on the demanding commercial and financial realities of running a professional rugby club.

Sale took 20,000 fans to Twickenham for the 1997 Pilkington Cup Final but Leicester won a mistake-ridden match 9–3. This interest quickly faded and the anticipated increased crowds never materialised and relegation from the Premier Division loomed until rugby union-playing local businessman Brian Kennedy came to the rescue late in the 1999–2000 season. Since then, the club has been on a sound financial footing.

Off the field, Peter Deakin was recruited from Warrington Wolves rugby league as chief executive to employ the skills he had used with the Bradford Bulls and Saracens and he made an immediate impact in raising the club's profile until hit by the serious illness which claimed his life in February 2003.

Success was not immediate; Sale Sharks finished eleventh and tenth in the 12-strong Premiership table in the first two years of the new Millennium. It took the coaching partnership of two former Sale players, Jim Mallinder and Steve Diamond, to produce a team that were 2002 runners-up and qualified for the Heineken Cup.

Player signings matched the elevated profile of the club. Scotland skipper Bryan Redpath was joined by Stuart Pinkerton, Barry Stewart, Graeme Bond, Jason White and Andrew Sheridan. The club then turned to the wealth of talent, hitherto largely untapped, in Rugby League. Apollo Perelini, known as "The Terminator" for his uncompromising style, joined Sale Sharks the day after helping St. Helens to victory in the Super League Grand Final at Old Trafford and the media had a field day when Jason Robinson, possibly the most exciting wing in the world in either code, moved to Sale from Wigan Warriors.

In 2002 the team also went on to capture the European Challenge Cup at Oxford's Kassam Stadium, defeating Pontypridd 25–22.

The latter Mallinder days saw the club at Twickenham again in 2004, losing narrowly to the Falcons in the Powergen Cup Final. In the summer of 2004 Jim Mallinder left Sale to take up a position in the RFU's National Academy. Following Mallinder's departure Sale appointed former French international Philippe Saint-André who had recently been turned down for the vacant position as coach of Wales. However, with a new influx of players including French internationals Sébastien Bruno and Sébastien Chabal helped Saint-André and Sale win the 2005 European Challenge Cup again at Oxford, this time 27–3 against Pau, for the second time in three years.

2005–06 season: Champions
New additions to the squad for the 2005–06 season included French prop Lionel Faure, Samoan back Elvis Seveali'i and Welsh number eight Nathan Bonner-Evans. Building on their European Challenge Cup success, Sale won 16 games out of 22 to finish two games clear at the top of the table. In the semi-final against London Wasps, they won 22–12. They won the 2006 Premiership title with a 45–20 win against Leicester Tigers.

2006–2009
After the success of the 2005–06 season many at the club had hoped for a repeat. However an injury crisis struck. More and more injuries were picked up over the following months until Sale were left with only 17 of a 38-man squad fit to play in their final Heineken Cup match against Ospreys.

In 2007–08, it was World Cup year so the club was without some of their big names. Sale appointed James Jennings as the new chief executive and Dean Schofield as the new captain. Sale had signed good players including Luke McAlister from the Blues in New Zealand.  The season was up and down. Successes included; beating Leicester Tigers home and away for the first time. However, the low points were not qualifying for the semi-finals in the Premiership or win a trophy.

On 19 August 2008, Juan Martín Fernández Lobbe was announced as the captain for the new season, replacing Jason White who was still recovering from an injury. 
A new Premiership record of four games without leaking a try was set at the start of the season, these games were Newcastle (A), Saracens (H), Bristol (A) and Gloucester (H).
Sale was knocked out of the European Cup in the group stages. Despite earning a win over Clermont, a defeat at home to Munster, a defeat to Montauban and Munster beating The Sharks in Ireland led to an exit.
Charlie Hodgson was voted the player of the year at the club's end-of-season awards on Thursday 30 April 2009.

Philippe Saint-André stepped down from his position as Director of Rugby at the end of the 2008–09 season. Along with the departure of Saint-André, a number of key players announced that their time at Sale was up. Captain Juan Martín Fernández Lobbe and cult figure Sébastien Chabal all bade farewell to the club at the end of the season.

2009–2013: Near relegation

For the 2009–10 season, Kingsley Jones was promoted from Head Coach to Director of Rugby; former Sale winger Jason Robinson became head coach. Sale had a disappointing 2009–10 season, finishing 11th in the Premiership and only securing safety from relegation on the penultimate weekend of the season. Sale's Heineken Cup campaign also ended in disappointment. The highlights of the campaign were a 27–26 win at home to Cardiff and wins home and away against Harlequins.

There were changes made in the coaching staff. Keith-Roach stepped down from his duties after deciding he could not commit to a full-time role. Robinson, who originally had no intentions to coach but responded to the club's request for help, left the club. Former All Black forward Mike Brewer replaced Robinson as head coach, while Jones remained as Director of Rugby.
In December 2010, after only eight months in the role, Brewer was sacked as head coach. Academy coach Pete Anglesea took over as first team coach on a temporary basis until the end of the season, leading Sale to a 10th-placed finish.

In the 2011–12 pre-season, former player Steve Diamond was announced as chairman. Immediately, an overhaul of the playing and coaching staff began, dubbed "Diamond's Revolution". Sale started the season well, but form faltered towards the latter half of the campaign, and Tony Hanks was fired as head coach after a defeat to Saracens. At the close of the season, Sale beat Gloucester and Bath to sixth place in the Premiership, meaning that they qualified for Heineken Cup in the 2012–13 season.

During the summer of 2012, Sale moved from Edgeley Park, their home since 2003, to the newly constructed Salford City Stadium (now renamed AJ Bell Stadium), to share with the Salford City Reds.

Sale had a disappointing 2012–13 season at their new stadium, spending most of the season in the relegation place before finishing 10th overall. Mark Cueto over took former Sale teammate Steve Hanley, as top try scorer in the premiership, with his 76th try.
Their first win of the season was against Cardiff Blues in the Heineken Cup, which was their only win in that year's Heineken Cup, where they finished bottom of their pool.
In the LV Cup in the knock-out stages, they beat Saracens in the semi-final, but lost in the final to Harlequins 14–31.

2013–2015
This season showed a huge improvement from the season before. Sale finished the season in sixth place, missing out on a place on the play-off competition, but managed to secure qualification to the inaugural European Rugby Champions Cup. They also managed to reach the quarter finals of the European Challenge Cup, where they lost to Northampton Saints.
Sale's successes in the season prompted England national team head coach Stuart Lancaster to call up six Sale players in to the squad to play in the summer tour.

For the 2014–15 season, the Sharks finished in seventh in the Aviva Premiership, while they finished bottom of their pool in the European Rugby Champions Cup, having pushed Munster, Saracens & Clermont Auvergne all the way at the AJ Bell Stadium. The standout players for this campaign were academy prospects Mike Haley and Josh Beaumont who became first team regulars, and Josh was called up for the England squad for the England XV which played the Barbarians in May, and scored a try.

2020–present

In the 2020–21 season, the Sharks finished 3rd in the Gallagher Premiership with a points total of 74. A semi-final tie away at Exeter Chiefs resulted in a 40 – 30 loss.
In the Heineken Champions Cup after finishing Pool A 8th with one point, Sale went on to beat Scarlets away 57 – 14 in the round of 16 setting up a last-eight away tie at La Rochelle resulting in a 45 – 21 defeat.
That season saw academy prospects Sam Dugdale, Bevan Rodd, Arron Reed and Raffi Quirke all become first-team regulars.

In December 2020, The former Director of Rugby Steve Diamond left the club due to family matters. He left three matches into the 2020–21 Premiership season with the team having won two of those games. Commenting on his time with Sale, Diamond said: “I built with Simon (Orange) and Ged (Mason) a fantastic management team, a great club, really solid foundations and I thought if there was a time for me to step aside and let the other people come through that was the best time."

In January 2021, Sale confirmed that Saracens forward coach Alex Sanderson took over the role of Director of Rugby at the club.
The 41-year-old started his senior playing career at Sale Sharks in 1998, after playing junior rugby at local club Littleborough. He went on to make 90 appearances for the club, with his leadership qualities earning him the club captaincy. Alex was quoted saying "I'm joining a club I know all about from my time here, but things have moved on massively since those days and the opportunity to come back home and achieve something special was just too good to turn down,".

Sale struggled in the first half of the 2021/22 season, which was Sanderson's first full season in charge. Results picked up in the new year but Sale narrowly missed out on the top 4 by 5 points, having to settle for a 6th place finish. For the second season in a row they were defeated by French opposition in the Champions Cup quarter final losing 41-22 to Racing Metro despite leading 10-6 at halftime. The season ended with farewells to the iconic Faf De Klerk, fellow South Africans Lood de Jager and Rohan Janse Van Rensburg and several other influential players including AJ Macginty, Cameron Neild and Curtis Langdon.

Ahead of the 2022/23 season the signings of Tom O'Flaherty and England internationals George Ford and Jonny Hill were announced. All three had won the Premiership with their respective former clubs. The season started with five consecutive league wins and the good form continued with Sale in 2nd position at the halfway point.

Kits

Current kit

The kit is supplied by Macron, the Italian technical sportswear firm will produce match day and training kit, leisurewear and accessories for the men's, women's and academy sides for the next six years. Macron will also become the clubs official retail partner.

"Featuring the traditional stripes that proved such a fans’ favourite in years gone by, the new home shirt is a modern take on the kit worn by the Sharks when they lifted the Premiership trophy 15 years ago.
The club's famous navy blue is teamed with Macron's royal blue and white to create a contemporary design laden with northern charm and Shark pride.

The away kit sees a return to the predominantly white colourway, but this time with a stylish grey and black camo twist on the chest section and shorts.

The 2021/22 kits celebrate the team, the community and the family that makes Sale Sharks unstoppable.
That sense of community is celebrated with the ‘Fabric of the North’ kit release campaign, which features some of the Sharks Family wearing the kit at iconic north west locations."

Season summaries

Gold background denotes championsSilver background denotes runners-upPink background denotes relegated

Club honours

Sale Sharks
English Premiership
Champions (1): 2005–06
Runners-up (1): 2001–02
RFU Championship
Champions (1): 1993–94
European Challenge Cup
Champions (2): 2001–02, 2004–05
Premiership Rugby Cup
Champions (1): 2019–20
Anglo-Welsh Cup
Runners-up (3): 1996–97, 2003–04, 2012–13
Cheshire RFU Cup (tiers 4–5) 
Champions (17): 1969–70, 1972–73, 1973–74, 1974–75, 1975–76, 1976–77, 1977–78, 1978–79, 1979–80, 1980–81, 1981–82, 1982–83, 1983–84, 1984–85, 1985–86, 1986–87, 1996–97
Runners-up (1): 1991–92

Sale Jets Reserves
Premiership Rugby Shield
Runners-up (1): 2010–11
Cheshire RFU Cup 
Champions (2): 2009–10, 2010–11 (shared)

Sevens
Middlesex Sevens
Champions (1): 1936
Glengarth Sevens Main Event
Champions (1): 1977
Glengarth Sevens Davenport Plate
Champions (2): 1968, 1985
Melrose Sevens
Champions (1): 2003
Glasgow City Sevens
Champions (2): 2007, 2009

Current squad

The Sale Sharks squad for the 2022–23 season is:

Notable former players

Lions Tourists 
The following Sale players have been selected for the Lions tours while at the club:

 G.A.M. Isherwood (1910 Tour to South Africa)
 William Michael Patterson (1959)
 Peter Stagg (1968) 
 Fran Cotton (1977 & 1980)
 Steve Smith (1980 & 1983)
 Jason Robinson (2001 & 2005)
 Andy Titterrell (2005)
 Andrew Sheridan (2005)
 Charlie Hodgson (2005)
 Mark Cueto (2005)
 Jason White (2005)
 Andrew Sheridan (2005 & 2009)
 Tom Curry (2021)

Rugby World Cup 
The following are players which have represented their countries at the Rugby World Cup whilst playing for Sale Sharks:

Sponsorship
Sale Sharks signed a three-year deal with Manchester business UKFast in 1999, the value of the deal being in excess of £2 million, at the same time they changed their name from Sale to Sale Sharks. Lawrence Jones Managing Director of UKFast is a keen supporter of the club.

In 2003, Global computer security software company McAfee were announced as a sponsor, originally the firm's logo was seen on Sale shirt collars a first in terms of sports sponsorship for the company. In April 2006 the company announced a three-year, seven-figure extension to its existing main club sponsorship at a time when Sale was leading the premiership with McAfee principal front of shirt sponsor.

UKFast, announced a new sponsorship deal in March 2009 which ended McAfee's four-year association with the club.
UKFast has been associated with the Sharks since 1999 but for the first time had the job of being the principal sponsor.
CEO Lawrence Jones decided to end the deal with Sale in April 2011, explaining that the decision was taken partly for business reasons, but also due to changes at the club – including Charlie Hodgson's departure at the end of the 2010–11 season.

In July 2011, the club announced that credit card lender MBNA would become the club's Principal Partner for the next three seasons, and that the partnership would see the MBNA logo on the front of all three of Sales Sharks' home, away and European shirts.
A two-year partnership extension was agreed in September 2013 lasting until the end of the 2015/16 season. 

After a five-year break UKFast became club sponsors again in July 2016, at the time this was the largest sponsorship deal in the history of the club.
CEO Lawrence Jones commented: “This partnership is more than a logo on a shirt. UKFast has been associated with Sale Sharks for more than a decade. It's a club that is incredibly close to my heart and I can't wait to contribute to its success. 

In October 2020, Manchester-based cyber technology company VST Enterprises announced it has launched what it claims is the world's first interactive sports kit for the club.
The men's team wore a ‘maze’ style logo – called a VCode, positioned between the name branding on the front of their shirts for the 2020/21 season.
The Vcode, similar to a QR code, could be scanned by fans via smartphone, allowing access to exclusive content.

On the 1st September 2021 Sale Sharks has signed up to a new long-term partnership with online electricals store, AO,  which will see the Bolton-based retailer take over as the club's principal front of shirt sponsor.
AO will also work closely with the Sharks Community Trust, the club's charitable arm, to create and launch ‘Are you AO-K?’, a life-changing mental health programme in schools across the North West.
The South Stand at Sharks’ AJ Bell Stadium will also be renamed and branded as the AO Stand, as part of the multi-year deal.
Sharks CEO Sid Sutton said: “Everyone at the club is so excited to welcome AO to the Sharks family. I have no doubt that this is a partnership that's going to drive the club onto the next level both on and off the pitch.

Records

Team records 

 Record Win: 76 – 0 vs Bristol Shoguns (Allied Dunbar Premiership, 1997-98)
 Record Loss: 58 – 5 vs London Wasps (Allied Dunbar Premiership, 1999-2000)
 Best League Position: 1st (Guinness Premiership, 2005-06)
 Worst League Position: 9th (Courage League National Division Two, 1989–90)

Player records 

 Most Premiership Appearances: Mark Cueto – 219
 Top Premiership Try Scorer: Mark Cueto – 90
 Top Premiership Points Scorer: Charlie Hodgson – 1,872

Notes

References

External links

 
BBC Sport Sale Sharks Page
Team Page at Scrum.com
Premiership Rugby Official Website

 
Premiership Rugby teams
English rugby union teams
Rugby clubs established in 1861
Sport in the Metropolitan Borough of Stockport
Clubs and societies in Greater Manchester
1861 establishments in England